Flock-1 is a CubeSat satellite constellation launched on 9 January 2014. The satellite is built in a CubeSat bus, and each constellation consists of 28 satellites.
All instruments are powered by solar cells mounted on the spacecraft body, along with triple-folded wings, providing approximately 20 watts at maximal power.

Launch 
Flock-1 constellation was launched from Mid-Atlantic Regional Spaceport Launch Pad 0, Wallops Island, on 9 January 2014 by an Antares 120 rocket. The satellites were deployed from the International Space Station (ISS) from 11 February 2014 to 28 February 2014.

Another Flock start in January 2015 on a Falcon 9 launch vehicle.

Mission 
The satellite is intended for commercial Earth observation service. For this purpose, each satellite is equipped with a camera capable of  ground resolution. Details of intended service by individual satellites were never released publicly and are largely unknown.

References

External links 
 Flock-1

Spacecraft launched in 2014
Commercial imaging satellites of the United States
CubeSats
Satellites deployed from the International Space Station